East Palestine is a village in northeastern Columbiana County, Ohio, United States. The population was 4,761 at the 2020 census. It is part of the Salem micropolitan area.

The city was home to industries in ceramics and tire manufacturing from the 1870s until the mid-1960s. East Palestine is located along the Norfolk Southern Railway and has a freight train station. On February 3, 2023, the village was near the site of a major derailment that spilled vinyl chloride and triggered significant evacuations in the jurisdiction.

History

East Palestine was founded in 1828 as Mechanicsburg and incorporated as a village in 1875 as East Palestine after the Middle Eastern region of Palestine. The name was changed as part of a religious nomenclature in the area, including communities such as Medina, Enon Valley, New Galilee and Salem; Palestine, Ohio, was already an incorporated community in the western part of the state. Having reached a population of 5,000, East Palestine operated as a statutory city from 1920 until 2011 when it reverted to village status because of declining population.

By the 1920s, railroad facilities of the city consisted of the four-track Pennsylvania Railroad system. Switches from the Pittsburgh, Lisbon, and Western Railroad within one mile of the corporation limits connected with the Pittsburgh and Lake Erie Railroad and New York Central Railroad. The city's leading industries were the manufacture of pottery and automobile tires by the W. S. George Pottery Company and the Edwin C. McGraw Tire Company. However, factories also existed that produced steel tanks, foundry work, electrical refractories, food products, electric wiring devices, wooden ventilators, fireproofing material, synthetic ice, and lumber. Around this time, East Palestine began to start an economy in orcharding, which still survives today. Large storage and preserving facilities made East Palestine the leading city for orchards in the area.

East Palestine became a qualified Tree City USA as recognized by the National Arbor Day Foundation in 2004.

2023 train derailment 

On February 3, 2023, an explosion and fire occurred following the derailment of a Norfolk Southern freight train carrying hazardous chemicals on the eastern end of town. A "state of emergency" was declared by the city council on February 4. An evacuation area was extended by Ohio Governor Mike DeWine on February 6 to allow for "a controlled release of vinyl chloride" and burning it in a nearby trench. Some residents subsequently started a class-action lawsuit against Norfolk Southern, citing new respiratory issues and unknown environmental impacts.

Geography
East Palestine is located along the eastern boundary of Columbiana County, almost touching Darlington Township, Pennsylvania. The village is part of Unity Township.

The following highways pass through East Palestine:
  State Route 46
  State Route 165
  State Route 170
  State Route 558

Two streams pass through the village; Leslie Run and Sulphur Run.

Demographics

2010 census
As of the census of 2010, there were 4,721 people, 1,898 households, and 1,282 families living in the city. The racial makeup of the city was 98.2% White, 0.2% African American, 0.1% Native American, 0.3% Asian, 0.4% from other races, and 0.7% from two or more races. Hispanic or Latino of any race were 0.9% of the population.

There were 1,898 households, of which 29.7% had children under the age of 18 living with them, 49.4% were married couples living together, 13.3% had a female householder with no husband present, 4.8% had a male householder with no wife present, and 32.5% were non-families. 27.3% of all households were made up of individuals, and 11.3% had someone living alone who was 65 years of age or older. The average household size was 2.46, and the average family size was 2.95.

The median age in the city was 40.7 years. 23.1% of residents were under the age of 18; 7.6% were between the ages of 18 and 24; 24.3% were from 25 to 44; 28.5% were from 45 to 64; and 16.5% were 65 years of age or older. The gender makeup of the city was 49.0% male and 51.0% female.

2000 census
As of the census of 2000, there were 4,917 people, 1,975 households, and 1,384 families living in the city. The population density was 1,772.1 people per square mile (685.4/km). There were 2,108 housing units at an average density of 759.7 per square mile (293.8/km). The racial makeup of the city was 98.47% White, 0.37% African American, 0.06% Native American, 0.14% Asian, 0.26% from other races, and 0.69% from two or more races. Hispanic or Latino of any race were 0.71% of the population.

There were 1,975 households, out of which 30.9% had children under the age of 18 living with them, 54.6% were married couples living together, 11.6% had a female householder with no husband present, and 29.9% were non-traditional families. 25.6% of all households were made up of individuals, and 14.1% had someone living alone who was 65 years of age or older. The average household size was 2.49, and the average family size was 2.98.

In the city, the population was spread out, with 24.9% under the age of 18, 7.5% from 18 to 24, 28.4% from 25 to 44, 22.6% from 45 to 64, and 16.7% who were 65 years of age or older. The median age was 38 years. For every 100 females, there were 93.2 males. For every 100 females aged 18 and over, there were 87.5 males.

The median income for a household in the city was $35,738, and the median income for a family was $40,057. Males had a median income of $30,550 versus $17,237 for females. The per capita income for the city was $16,243. About 5.5% of families and 10.0% of the population were below the poverty line, including 22.0% of those under age 18 and 2.2% of those aged 65 or over.

Government
East Palestine operates under a chartered council–manager government; there are six council members elected as a legislature and a mayor who serves as the council's president. All are elected for four-year terms. The council employs a village manager for administration. As of 2020, the mayor was Trent R. Conaway, and the village manager was Mark McTrustry.

Education

The East Palestine City School District serves children in East Palestine. The district formerly operated multiple schools throughout the city; a new middle school and a renovated elementary campus were built surrounding the existing high school in 1997. The current schools in the district are:
 East Palestine Elementary School – grades K-4
 East Palestine Middle School – grades 5–8
 East Palestine High School – grades 9–12

The village is home to a public library, first opened in 1920.

Notable residents
 Linda Bolon, member of the Ohio House of Representatives from the 1st district and four-term Columbiana County Treasurer
 Sarah Burgess, singer-songwriter, contestant on American Idol Season 6
 Charles Burleigh Galbreath, writer, historian, educator, and librarian
 R. S. Hamilton, 33rd Speaker of the Oregon House of Representatives
 Wynn Hawkins, Major League Baseball pitcher
 Martha Hill, dance instructor at the Juilliard School and advocate of modern dance
 Fred Hoaglin, National Football League center, two-time Super Bowl champion coach with the New York Giants
 Roger M. Kyes, fourth United States Deputy Secretary of Defense
 Crystal Mackall, physician and immunologist
 Jerry McGee, PGA Tour professional golfer
 J. T. Miller, National Hockey League left winger for the Vancouver Canucks
 George Morris, National Football League halfback
 Jesse R. Pitts, sociologist
 Volney Rogers, founder of Mill Creek Park
 R. J. Thomas, second president of the United Automobile Workers

References

External links
 Village website

Villages in Columbiana County, Ohio
Villages in Ohio
1828 establishments in Ohio
Populated places established in 1828